Acanthoscelides obtectus, the bean weevil, is a species of beetle. The species was described in 1831 by Thomas Say.

Bean weevils feed on vetches, beans and other leguminous plants. They are generally considered a pest species for this reason.

Originating in Central America they have been inadvertently spread around the world in grain shipments.

Taxonomy
American naturalist Thomas Say named the bean weevil species as Acanthoscelides obtectus in 1831.

Description
Bean weevils are small beetles, ranging in size from 2 to 5 mm.
They range in colour from light to dark brown, with longitudinal spots on their elytra, which has a red posterior border. Eleytra does not cover the abdominal end. Legs are yellow red and antenna red brown. The head is bent forward and lacks the long snout that is characteristic of true weevils.

Eggs are milky white. Larvae are white with a yellow head during their first instar and white with a brownish head from the second instar. Larvae have bristles and three pairs of legs.

Life cycle
Bean weevils develop and feed upon leguminous plants. Adult bean weevils hibernate inside the seeds or seed pods of these plants. Adults emerge from hibernation in April to mate. Female bean weevils lay eggs onto seed pods, or into them by chewing holes, in groups of 2 to 20 eggs. A single female can lay up to 200 eggs. but 40 is average fecundity. Egg development can take 30 to 45 days before a 1st instar larvae merges. After approximately 3 days the larvae then moults and becomes a second instar larvae which then begin to consume the seed, with the larval stage lasting 3 to  weeks in total.
The larvae then pupates inside the seed, taking 9 to 29 days.
The life cycle of a single generation takes from 100 to 110 days. If the seeds are stored in a warm place multiple generations can be produced one after another.

Distribution and habitat
Bean weevils are originally native to Central America, however grain shipments at the end of the 19th century introduced the species to Europe where it subsequently spread around the globe. It is now found in Europe, Asia, North and South America, Africa, Australia and elsewhere.

The species favours warmer climates, with the most favourable temperatures being 27–29 °C for adults, 24–27 °C for larvae, and 22–26 °C for pupa. Temperatures higher or lower than this can cause a decrease in the number of eggs lain and they are very vulnerable to temperatures below 0 °C. This limits the species to how far north it can spread, and is found only as far north as northern Lithuania, with some being found in south-west Siberia.

As parasite host
A number of parasitoid wasp are associated with the bean weevil larvae.

As a pest species
The bean weevil is a significant pest in some parts of the world, especially in areas such as Australia where it is non-native. It damages crops both in situ and when stored in warehouses, and can potentially reduce crop yields by 60% as the larvae develop at the expense of the seeds.

References

External links
 

Bruchinae
Beetles described in 1831
Taxa named by Thomas Say
Beetles of Central America